HMS Psyche was a wooden Psyche-class paddle despatch vessel built to an 1860 design by Isaac Watts. She was ordered from Pembroke Dockyard in and launched on 29 March 1862, having cost c. £43,000 to build.

She was at Suez for the opening ceremonies of the canal in 1869.

She was wrecked on 15 December 1870 off Catania, Italy, while carrying a party including George Howard Darwin to observe the solar eclipse from Sicily. Her wreck was blown up in February 1871.

References

 
 

 

Ships of the Royal Navy
Ships built in Pembroke Dock
1862 ships
Shipwrecks in the Mediterranean Sea
Maritime incidents in December 1870